Young American Primitive (real name Greg Scanavino) is a prominent American producer/remixer, and one of the more popular acts to originate from the Bay Area's early 1990s' house scene. He released several 12"s and one full length CD on the San Francisco-based label ZoëMagik, and made several compilation appearances, culminating with the sample heavy "These Waves" being included on Sasha and Digweed's Northern Exposure mix album. Apparently impressed by his remixing skills on Geffen Records' release The Stone Roses' single "Begging You", Scanavino was signed by Geffen in 1996 and finished his second full length album in late 1997. The track "Beyond" was scheduled for single release in November 1997 (complete with music video created by the San Francisco multimedia studio Mind's Eye Media), and the album, titled African Cosmopolitan', was scheduled for a January 1998 release. However, neither appeared and Young American Primitive was apparently dropped by the label. The ZoëMagik-released album was not re-released on Geffen due to unresolved sample clearance issues.

Scanavino returned to the electronic music scene in 2001 with remixes on two popular progressive house tracks, as well as collaborating with the American producer and DJ Jimmy Van M and vocalist Terra Deva on "Forget Time". In 2005, he contributed the track "Voyage To The Great Attractor" to DJ Jonathan Lisle for the second volume in Bedrock's Original Series.

The voice sampling in the "Intro" is from Alfred Hitchcock's film Rope. The voice samplings on "Flux" and "These Waves" are of Donald Pleasence from The Outer Limits episode "The Man with the Power" (1963). The voice sampling on "Over and Out" beginning with "Did you know that 'if' is the middle word in life..." is of Dennis Hopper from the film Apocalypse Now during the scene when the boat finally arrives at Colonel Walter E. Kurtz's outpost and to be met by Hopper's character.

Scanavino has moved from San Francisco to Brooklyn, New York, according to the address of YAP Lab, where he produced Voyage To The Great Attractor.

Young American Primitive LP
 "Intro" - 0:20 
 "Trance Formation" - 6:05
 "Flux" - 0:40 
 "Young American Primitive" - 6:08
 "Ritual" - 6:11
 "Sunrise" - 8:03
 "Daydream - 4:20
 "Over and Out - 6:50
 "These Waves - 6:47
 "Monolith Part One - 5:06
 "Monolith Part Two - 7:26

References
Profile at Discogs''

Notes

External links
YAPLAB Recordings
Sources of voice samples in music - Young American Primitive
Information on Greg Scanavino and his business with Geffen Records
Profile at www.imdb.com
A review of the LP at EvilSponge
"The Outer Limits" episode "The Man with the Power - 1963

Young American Primitive